Pearl Harbor Glacier is a major tributary glacier flowing generally east from the Victory Mountains and entering the southwest side of Tucker Glacier 17 nautical miles (31 km) northwest of Bypass Hill. Named by the New Zealand Geological Survey Antarctic Expedition (NZGSAE) 1957–58, to commemorate the heroism of the United States forces at Pearl Harbor in 1941.

Glaciers of Victoria Land
Borchgrevink Coast